The Case of the Stuttering Pig is a 1937 Warner Bros. Looney Tunes animated cartoon directed by Frank Tashlin. The short was released on October 30, 1937, and stars Porky Pig and Petunia Pig.

The title is a parody of The Case of the Stuttering Bishop, a Perry Mason mystery that Warner Bros. had filmed earlier that year. This is the only cartoon where Petunia Pig appears as Porky's sister.

Plot
On a dark and stormy night, Porky and his brothers (Patrick, Percy, Portis, Peter) and sister (Petunia) learn from lawyer Goodwill that they are set to inherit a fortune from their deceased rich uncle Solomon, with the "kindly" lawyer next in line after them. After Goodwill leaves, he walks into a secret laboratory and drinks a bottle of Jekyll and Hyde juice and turns into a hideous monster bent on killing them. The monster breaks the fourth wall and warns the audience not to interfere, with special emphasis by threatening the guy in the third row (who was voiced by Mel Blanc). One by one, he kidnaps the brothers, leaving only Porky and Petunia. As Porky and Petunia walk through the house, trying to find their brothers, the monster grabs Petunia, unbeknownst to Porky, and then starts trailing Porky. When Porky sees the monster, he screams and runs up the stairs, only to meet the monster at the top. He then screams and runs down the stairs, into the laboratory where the monster is holding his siblings prisoner. No sooner has Porky freed them than the monster breaks in and corners all of the pigs. Just when it seems the monster is going to kill them, a thrown theater chair (seemingly out of nowhere) flies into the monster, trapping him in the stocks where he had them in earlier.

All six pigs (amazed by the incident): Who did that?!

Mel Blanc (shouting angrily): ME!

Monster (shocked at who attacked him): Who are YOU?!

Mel Blanc (replying angrily): I'm the guy in the third row, ya big sourpuss!!!

Home media
This short was released on the fourth Looney Tunes Golden Collection DVD box set on November 14, 2006. It was also released on the Porky Pig 101 DVD on September 19, 2017.

References

External links
 

1937 films
Looney Tunes shorts
Short films directed by Frank Tashlin
American black-and-white films
1930s American animated films
Self-reflexive films
Dr. Jekyll and Mr. Hyde films
Porky Pig films
Films scored by Carl Stalling
1937 animated films